Rhytiphora neglecta is a species of beetle in the family Cerambycidae. It was described by Francis Polkinghorne Pascoe in 1863, originally under the genus Symphyletes. It is known from Australia. It feeds on Acacia longifolia.

References

neglecta
Beetles described in 1863